Lieutenant General Walter Koipaton Raria, is a Kenyan military officer. Between July 2018 and July 2022, he served as the Commander Kenya Army, a service branch of the Kenya Defence Forces (KDF).

Background

At the time of his appointment to his current assignment, Lt. General Walter Raria was the Deputy Commander of the Kenya Army, a position that he had served in for the previous two years. He replaced Lieutenant General Robert Kibochi, who was promoted to the position of Vice Chief of the Kenya Defence Forces ...

As Commander of the Army
Lt. General Raria was sworn in as Army Commander on 13 July 2018. He is the 21st Commander of the Kenya Army.

In July 2022, Uhuru Kenyatta, the president of Kenya at that time, appointed Lieutenant General Peter Mbogo Njiru, as the 22nd Commander of the Kenyan Army. The handover ceremony took place at the Department of Defence Headquarters in Nairobi, on 8 August 2022. General Raria retired from the Kenyan military, later in 2022.

See also
 Uhuru Kenyatta
 Kenya Navy
 Kenya Air Force
 Kenya Coast Guard Service

References

External links
 The Vice Chief of Defence Forces Lt Gen Robert Kibochi has handed over command of the Kenya Army to Lt Gen Walter Raria

Succession table

Personnel of the Kenya Army
Living people
Year of birth missing (living people)